The men's triple jump at the 2009 World Championships in Athletics was held at the Olympic Stadium on 16 and 18 August. The season had seen a number of athletes performing to a high level before the championships, with reigning World and Olympic champion Nelson Évora leading with 17.66 metres and all three athletes of the Cuban team having jumped over 17.60 m in the season. The other athlete to jump that distance was Phillips Idowu, who was keen make up for his loss to Évora in the 2008 Olympics. The Olympic medallists Évora, Idowu, and Leevan Sands, and the Cuban trio of David Giralt, Yoandris Betanzos and Alexis Copello, were judged to be the strongest competitors entering the competition.

In the qualifying rounds, Évora and Idowu were the first to pass the automatic qualifying mark of 17.15 metres, recording bests of 17.44 and 17.32 m respectively. Chinese jumper Li Yanxi was the third through the qualifying mark, and Sands and Giralt soon followed. The qualifying was not of the same standard as the 2008 Olympic final, as Copello and Dmitrij Valukevic rounded out the top twelve competitors with jumps under 17 m.

In the final, Olympic champion Évora set the standard with a first jump of 17.54 m, Idowu also started well with a jump of 17.51 m. Giralt and Sands moved into third and fourth with jumps around the 17.2 m mark. Évora led the competition until round three, where Idowu produced a personal best and world-leading jump of 17.73 m to take the top spot. A large jump by Alexis Copello followed, but he was given the red flag, indicating a foul. Sands' season's best jump of 17.32 m moved him into the third medal spot, but it was Copello's final jump of 17.36 m that took the bronze medal. Évora's best also came in the final round, but the 17.55-metre jump did not rival that of Idowu. It was the thirty-one-year-old Briton's first ever major title, building on his silver medal at the 2008 Beijing Olympics.

Medalists

Records
Prior to the competition, the following records were as follows.

Phillips Idowu beat Évora's world leading mark in the competition, jumping 17.73 metres.

Qualification standards

Schedule

Results

Qualification
Qualification: Qualifying Performance 17.15 (Q) or at least 12 best performers (q) advance to the final.

Key:  NR = National record, PB = Personal best, Q = qualification by place in heat, q = qualification by overall place, SB = Seasonal best

Final

Key:  SB = Seasonal best, WL = World leading (in a given season)

References
General
Triple jump results. IAAF. Retrieved on 2009-08-16.
Specific

Triple jump
Triple jump at the World Athletics Championships